Étude Op. 25, No. 2, in F minor, is an étude composed by Frédéric Chopin. It was marked 'Presto'. It was preceded by a relative major key. It is based on a polyrhythm, with pairs of eighth-note (quaver) triplets in the right hand against quarter-note (crotchet) triplets in the left. The étude is sometimes known as "The Bees".

Johannes Brahms wrote a revision of this étude, where the right hand part is played entirely in sixths and thirds. Virtuoso pianist and composer Leopold Godowsky later transcribed the étude for the left hand alone (transposed to F-sharp minor).

External links 

 
 Op. 25, No. 2 played by Emil von Sauer
 Op. 25, No. 2 played by Wilhelm Backhaus
 Op. 25, No. 2 played by Alfred Cortot
 Op. 25, No. 2 played by Claudio Arrau
 Op. 25, No. 2 played by Shura Cherkassky
 Op. 25, No. 2 played by Samson François
 Op. 25, No. 2 played by Vladimir Ashkenazy
 Op. 25, No. 2 played by Maurizio Pollini

25 02
1836 compositions
Compositions in F minor